In the elections to the Senate of Virginia, United States in October 1991, the Republican Party gained 8 seats from the Democrats, but the Democrats retained a majority with 22 seats to the Republicans' 18. One electoral district was newly created and another two were merged into one.

Overall results

Results by district

See also 
 United States elections, 1991
 Virginia elections, 1991
 Virginia House of Delegates election, 1991

References

1991 Virginia elections
Virginia Senate elections
Virginia